The 1990 BYU Cougars football team represented Brigham Young University (BYU) in the 1990 NCAA Division I-A football season. The Cougars offense scored 524 points while the defense allowed 350 points. Led by head coach LaVell Edwards, the team participated in the Holiday Bowl.

Schedule

Roster

Preseason

Ty Detmer was entering his third year as a starter and a Heisman Trophy candidate. Head coach LaVell Edwards considered him so valuable that he was allowed to go through spring practice untouched. While Detmer and tight Chris Smith were projected to lead another high-flying BYU offense, Edwards was looking for improvement with the team's defense that had been embarrassed in the Holiday Bowl by Penn State, which had led him to pay a visit to the San Francisco 49ers in the offseason. Even with their defensive deficiencies, BYU was considered a Top 20 squad and expected to once again to win the WAC.

Game summaries

Game 1: UTEP

Game 2: Miami (FL)

Utah

Statistics

Passing

Awards and honors
Heisman Trophy: Ty Detmer 
Maxwell Award: Ty Demter 
Davey O'Brien Award: Ty Detmer
Runner Up WAC Defensive Player of the Year: Alema Fitisemanu
All-WAC: (1st) Alema Fitisemanu, Matt Bellini, Andy Boyce, Ty Detmer, Neal Fort, Earl Kauffman (P), Rich Kaufusi, Brian Mitchell, Robert Stephens, (2nd) Mike Keim, Rocky Biegel, Tony Crutchfield  
East West Shrine All Star Game: Alema Fiitsemanu, Rich Kaufusi, Chris Smith, Andy Boyce

Team players in the NFL
The following were selected in the 1991 NFL Draft.

References

BYU
BYU Cougars football seasons
Western Athletic Conference football champion seasons
BYU Cougars football